Arthur Crompton (9 January 1903 – 1987) was a professional footballer who played for Tottenham Hotspur, Southend United, Brentford, Crystal Palace, Tranmere Rovers and Northwich Victoria.

Football career 
Crompton began his career playing for Devon County, and later he represented the British Army football team. 

The versatile winger who could play on either flank, joined Tottenham Hotspur in 1928. He scored on his 'Lilywhites' debut in a 2–1 defeat to Bristol City at Ashton Gate in November 1928 in the old Second Division. Crompton featured in 15 matches, netting three goals in his time at White Hart Lane. 

Crompton signed for Southend United in 1930 where he went on to make 58 appearances, scoring on 20 occasions. 

In 1932, Crompton joined Brentford and notched up a further 14 goals in 43 matches before signing for Crystal Palace. 

Crompton featured in 26 games, scoring six goals in his spell at Selhurst Park. 

He moved onto Tranmere Rovers in 1935, before finally ending his career at Northwich Victoria.

Honours 
Brentford
 Football League Third Division South: 1932–33

References 

1903 births
1987 deaths
English footballers
English Football League players
Tottenham Hotspur F.C. players
Southend United F.C. players
Brentford F.C. players
Crystal Palace F.C. players
Tranmere Rovers F.C. players
Northwich Victoria F.C. players
Footballers from Birmingham, West Midlands
Association football wingers
20th-century British Army personnel